Yo quiero ser tonta ("I Want to be a Fool") is a 1950 Mexican film. It stars Sara García.

External links
 

1950 films
1950s Spanish-language films
Films based on works by Carlos Arniches
Mexican comedy-drama films
1950 comedy-drama films
Mexican black-and-white films
1950s Mexican films